Aruba competed in the Olympic Games for the first time at the 1988 Summer Olympics in Seoul, South Korea. Previously, Aruba was part of Netherlands Antilles, Kingdom of the Netherlands until 1986. Eight competitors, four men and four women, took part in ten events in five sports.

Competitors
The following is the list of number of competitors in the Games.

Athletics

Women
Track & road events

Boxing

Men

Fencing

One male fencer represented Aruba in 1988.

Men

Individual

Judo

Men

Synchronized swimming

Two synchronized swimmers represented Aruba in 1988.

Women

References

External links
Official Olympic Reports

Nations at the 1988 Summer Olympics
1988
1988 in Aruba